The following is a timeline of the history of the city of Amiens, France.

Prior to 20th century

 3rd century – Roman Catholic Diocese of Amiens established.
 1117 – Charter of commune granted to Amiens by the bishop.
 1185 – Amiens becomes part of the crown lands of France per .
 1220 – Amiens Cathedral construction begins.
 1390 – Public clock installed (approximate date).
 1435 - Philip the Good of Burgundy in power per Congress of Arras.
 1477 - Amiens again becomes part of the crown lands of France.
 1496 – Amiens customary laws codified.
 1550 – Town Hall construction begins.
 1597 – Siege of Amiens (1597).
 1750 –  founded.
 1751 –  (garden) created.
 1761 –  established.
 1790 – Amiens becomes part of the Somme souveraineté.
 1791 –  founded.
 1796 –  established in the Hôtel des Feuillants.
 1800 – Population: 41,279.
 1802
 25 March: International peace treaty signed in Amiens.
 Picardy Museum founded.
 1817 –  established.
 1837 –  established.
 1848 – Longueau–Boulogne railway begins operating.
 1863 –  established.
 1865 –  active.
 1870 – November: Battle of Amiens (1870); Prussians in power.
 1886 – Population: 80,288.
 1889 –  (assembly hall) opens.
 1891 –  begins operating.

20th century

 1901 – Amiens Sporting Club formed.
 1902 –  shop in business.
 1911 – Population: 93,207.
 1913 – French Grand Prix automotive race held in Amiens.
 1914 – City "taken and lost by Germans."
 1918 – August: Battle of Amiens (1918) fought near city.
 1940 – May–June: .
 1944 – Le Courrier picard newspaper begins publication.
 1946 -  begins operating.
 1952 -  established.
 1954 – Tour Perret (Amiens) hi-rise built.
 1958 – Gare d'Amiens rebuilt.
 1960 – Amiens twinned with Dortmund, Germany.
 1962 – Population: 105,433.
 1966 –  inaugurated.
 1970 – University of Picardie Jules Verne established.
 1971 - Amiens twinned with Görlitz, Germany.
 1973 - Amiens twinned with Darlington, United Kingdom.
 1981 –  active.
 1999
 Stade de la Licorne (stadium) opens.
  newspaper begins publication.
 Population: 135,501.
 2000 – Communauté d'agglomération Amiens Métropole created.

21st century

 2006 – Amiens twinned with Tulsa, USA.
 2011 – Population: 133,327.
 2012 – August: Youth unrest.
 2014
 January: Labour unrest at Goodyear factory.
 March:  held.
 Brigitte Fouré becomes mayor.
 2015 – December: 2015 Nord-Pas-de-Calais-Picardie regional election held.
 2016 – Amiens becomes part of the Hauts-de-France region.

See also
 History of Amiens
 
 
 
  department
  region

Other cities in the Hauts-de-France region:
 Timeline of Lille
 Timeline of Roubaix

References

This article incorporates information from the French Wikipedia.

Bibliography

in English

in French
 
 
 
  (Table of contents)

External links

 Items related to Amiens, various dates (via Europeana).
 Items related to Amiens, various dates (via Digital Public Library of America).

Amiens
Amiens
amiens